The 2015 Weymouth and Portland Borough Council election took place on 7 May 2015 to elect 12 members of Weymouth and Portland Borough Council in England. This was on the same day as the 2015 general election.

The elections saw the Conservative Party gain 3 seats and become the largest party on the council with 14 seats, but without an overall majority. The Labour Party was reduced to 13 seats compared to the 15 they had after the 2014 election.

After the election, the composition of the council was
Conservative 14
Labour 13
Liberal Democrat 6
Independent 2
UKIP 1

Election result

Gain/loss is relative to the  2011 results.

Councillors standing down
The following councillors were elected in 2011 and had to seek re-election.

No elections: Littlemoor, Underhill, Westham East

Anne Kenwood became an independent in March 2015.

Ward results

References

2015 English local elections
May 2015 events in the United Kingdom
2015
2010s in Dorset